This was the third season where the FA Cup, or the Football Association Challenge Cup, used a series of qualifying rounds in order to determine qualifiers for the actual Cup competition itself and the first season that a Preliminary Round was used.

See 1890–91 FA Cup for details of the rounds from the First Round onwards.

Preliminary round

First qualifying round

Second qualifying round

Third qualifying round

Fourth qualifying round

References

FA Cup qualifying rounds
Qualifying